James Peter Rourke (born February 10, 1957) is a former professional American football offensive lineman in the National Football League. He played seven seasons for the Kansas City Chiefs (1980–1984, 1986), the New Orleans Saints (1985) and the Cincinnati Bengals (1988).

External links
Boston College Eagles bio

1957 births
Living people
Sportspeople from Weymouth, Massachusetts
Players of American football from Massachusetts
American football offensive tackles
American football offensive guards
Boston College Eagles football players
Kansas City Chiefs players
New Orleans Saints players
Cincinnati Bengals players